In Concert, Zürich, October 28, 1979 is a jazz album by pianist Chick Corea and vibraphonist Gary Burton. It features live versions of songs that the duo played on the albums Crystal Silence and Duet.

Technical details 

In Concert was recorded live, as the title suggests, and released in 1980 as a double LP set. The original release contains 10 tracks with a total length of 79:59. The album was subsequently reissued on a single CD and in the process shortened to 8 tracks for a length of 61:16.

In 2009 the 4-CD set Crystal Silence, The ECM Recordings 1972-79 was released, containing the three albums: Crystal Silence (1973), Duet (1979) and the full LP-edition of In Concert (1980).

Track listing

Awards

In Concert won the 1982 Grammy Award for Best Jazz Instrumental Album, Individual or Group.

Chart performance

Sources

Chick Corea, Gary Burton, and Steve Swallow. In Concert, Zürich, October 28, 1979 (LP recording, 1980). Burbank, California: ECM, distributed by Warner Bros. Records. .

References 

Gary Burton live albums
Instrumental duet albums
Chick Corea live albums
Collaborative albums
1980 live albums
ECM Records live albums
Albums produced by Manfred Eicher
Grammy Award for Best Jazz Instrumental Album